Henry Ketcham may refer to:

 Hank Ketcham (1920–2001), American cartoonist
 Hank Ketcham (American football) (1891–1986), American college football player
 Henry H. Ketcham (born 1949), Canadian businessman

See also 
 Ketcham (surname)
 Henry Ketchum (1839–1896), Canadian railway engineer and businessman